The 2016 Thomas & Uber Cup was the 29th tournament of the Thomas Cup and 26th tournament of the Uber Cup, the premier badminton team championships for men and women respectively. It was held at the Kunshan Sports Centre in Kunshan, Jiangsu Province, China.

Host city selection 
Jakarta and Kunshan submitted bids for this championships, the same situation as the bid for 2015 BWF World Championships. Kunshan was named as the host in May 2014 during BWF Council meeting in New Delhi, India.

Qualifiers

Seedings

The seeding list was based on 3 March 2016 World Rankings.

Thomas Cup
 (Quarterfinal)
  (Champion)
 (Semifinal)
 (Final)
 (Quarterfinal)
 (Semifinal)
 (Group)
 (Quarterfinal)
 (Quarterfinal)
 (Group)
 (Group)
 (Group)
 (Group)
 (Group)
 (Group)
 (Group)

Uber Cup (Champion)
 (Semifinal)
 (Final)
 (Quarterfinal)
 (Semifinal)
 (Quarterfinal)
  (Quarterfinal)
 (Quarterfinal)
 (Group)
 (Group)
 (Group)
 (Group)
 (Group)
 (Group)
 (Group)
 (Group)

Squads

Thomas Cup
All times are UTC+08:00

Groups

Group A

Group B

Group C

Group D

Knockout stage

Quarterfinals

Semifinals

Final

Final ranking

Uber Cup
All times are UTC+08:00

Groups

Group A

Group B

Group C

Group D

Knockout stage

Quarterfinals

Semifinals

Final

Final ranking

References

External links
 
 BWF Thomas & Uber Cups 2016 at tournamentsoftware.com

 
International sports competitions hosted by China
Thomas
2016 in Chinese sport
Kunshan
Sport in Jiangsu
Badminton tournaments in China
Thomas & Uber Cup